KHRT (1320 AM) is a Christian radio station located in Minot, North Dakota. It is one of two religious stations, along with KHRT-FM, owned and operated in Minot by Faith Broadcasting. KHRT concentrates on a Southern gospel format, and also airs satellite-fed programming from Salem Communications during overnights and weekends.

Although classified as a commercial radio station by the Federal Communications Commission (FCC), Faith Broadcasting acts as a nonprofit organization using commercial advertisements for funding, though it also takes donations.

History

KHRT first went on the air in 1958 as KQDY in Minot, licensed to Dakota Broadcasters on 1320 kHz, with 1 kilowatt, daytime only. The call letters were changed to KHRT in 1964.

Expanded Band assignment

On March 17, 1997 the FCC announced that eighty-eight stations had been given permission to move to newly available "Expanded Band" transmitting frequencies, ranging from 1610 to 1700 kHz, with KHRT authorized to move from 1320 to 1620 kHz. However, the construction permit needed to implement the authorization was cancelled on December 22, 2000, so the expanded band assignment was never built.

References

External links
KHRT website

FCC History Cards for KHRT (covering 1958-1980 as KQDY / KHRT)

HRT
Contemporary Christian radio stations in the United States
Radio stations established in 1958
1958 establishments in North Dakota
Southern Gospel radio stations in the United States
HRT